Myth is a folklore genre consisting of narratives that play a fundamental role in society. Subsets include:

Myth may also refer to:

 Urban myth, a story circulated as true, often attributed to "a friend of a friend".
 Origin myth, which purports to describe the origin of some feature of the natural or social world
 Creation myth, symbolic narrative of how the world began and how people first came to inhabit it
 National myth, inspiring narrative or anecdote about a nation's past
 Political myth, ideological explanation for a political phenomenon that is believed by a social group

Music
 Myth: The Xenogears Orchestral Album, an album by Yasunori Mitsuda
 "Myth" (song), by Beach House from the album Bloom
 Myth (album), by Two Steps from Hell

Video games
 Myth (1989 video game), a 1989 text adventure by Magnetic Scrolls
 Myth: History in the Making, a 1989 platform game by System 3
 Myth (series), a 1997–2001 series of real-time tactical computer games, including:
Myth: The Fallen Lords
Myth II: Soulblighter
Myth III: The Wolf Age

Other uses
 Myth (gamer), a video game streamer and esports player
 Myth (warez), an underground PC game cracking group
 Myth-, a prefix in the MythTV open source software project
 M.Y.T.H. Inc., a corporation in Robert Asprin's MythAdventures series
 "Myth", a disc golf putter by Infinite Discs

See also
 The Myth (disambiguation)
 Mythic (disambiguation)
 Mythos (disambiguation)
 Mythology (disambiguation)
 Mythopoeia